PKP Group is a Polish corporate group founded in 2001 from the former state enterprise, Polish State Railways. The purpose of this change was to separate infrastructure management and transport operations.

It consists of the following companies, of which PKP S.A. has the dominant position:

PKP Group has sold PKP Energetyka, an electricity supplier and most of the shares in PKP Polskie Linie Kolejowe, an infrastructure manager.

See also 
 Rail transport in Poland

References

External links
,  Online rail timetables
PKP (SA) official site
Group's overview in PDF (Polish only)

Railway companies of Poland
Companies based in Warsaw
Railway companies established in 2001
Government-owned companies of Poland
Polish companies established in 2001
Polish brands
Polish State Railways
Corporate groups